The 2014 Giro d'Italia began on 9 May, and stage 11 occurred on 21 May. The 2014 edition began with a team time trial in Belfast. The first three stage of the Giro began in Northern Ireland, while the Giro returned to Italy on 13 May, after the first rest day.

Stage 1
9 May 2014 — Belfast (Northern Ireland), team time trial (TTT)

Stage 2
10 May 2014 — Belfast (Northern Ireland) to Belfast (Northern Ireland),

Stage 3
11 May 2014 — Armagh (Northern Ireland) to Dublin (Republic of Ireland),

Stage 4
13 May 2014 — Giovinazzo to Bari,

Stage 5
14 May 2014 — Taranto to Viggiano,

Stage 6
15 May 2014 — Sassano to Montecassino, 

Stage 7
16 May 2014 — Frosinone to Foligno,

Stage 8
17 May 2014 — Foligno to Montecopiolo,

Stage 9
18 May 2014 — Lugo to Sestola,

Stage 10
20 May 2014 — Modena to Salsomaggiore Terme, 

On this stage, members of the  team wore a white cockade, in memory of the people who died in the Fundación bus fire in Colombia.

Stage 11

21 May 2014 — Collecchio to Savona,

References

2014 Giro d'Italia
Giro d'Italia stages